is a B.League professional basketball team, based in the eastern Mikawa and Hamamatsu, Shizuoka Prefecture region of central Japan.

The team was founded in 1965 as the company team of the OSG Corporation, a Toyokawa-based machine parts manufacturer. It remained a local team in Aichi prefecture until 1995, when it first participated in the All-Japan Professional Basketball Championships. It joined the Japan Basketball League (JBL) in 1999, winning the Second Division championship in 2000. “Higashimikawa” was added to the team name in 2007, when its home stadium was moved to Toyohashi. It ended the 2007 season in third place.

From 2008, the Higashimikawa Phoenix joined the new bj league, and the following year, “Hamamatsu” was added to the team name to emphasize the compound franchise among Toyohashi, Hamamatsu, and the surrounding districts and the team was legally registered as an independent corporation under the name of “Phoenix Communications”. The team signed the noted Chinese basketball star, Sun Mingming, in 2008.

In July 2015 it was announced that the team will compete in the first division of the new Japan Professional Basketball League, which will commence from October 2016. Accordingly it was changed the club name to "SAN-EN NEOPHOENIX", and transferred to the home arena to Toyohashi.

Honours 
League champions: 3
2009
2010
2015

Current roster

Notable players
To appear in this section a player must have either:
- Set a club record or won an individual award as a professional player.

- Played at least one official international match for his senior national team or one NBA game at any time.

Coaches
 Kazuo Nakamura
 Ryuji Kawai
 Tomoya Higashino
 Hiroki Fujita
 Brian Rowsom
 Shuto Kawachi
 Branislav Vićentić
 Atsushi Ōno

Arenas
Toyohashi City General Gymnasium
Hamamatsu Arena
Green Arena

Practice facilities

OSG Gymnasium

External links

Notes

 
Basketball teams established in 1965
Basketball teams in Japan
Sports teams in Shizuoka Prefecture
1965 establishments in Japan